Mauricia Prieto (born 20 November 1995) is a Trinidad and Tobago track and field athlete who specializes in sprint. She placed fourth in women's 4 × 100 metres relay with the Trinidadian team at the 2019 Pan American Games, and also competed in women's 200 metres. Representing Trinidad and Tobago at the 2019 World Athletics Championships, she competed in women's 200 metres and women's 4 × 100 metres relay. In the 200 metres event she did not advance to compete in the semi-finals.

References

External links

Trinidad and Tobago female sprinters
1995 births
Living people
World Athletics Championships athletes for Trinidad and Tobago
Pan American Games competitors for Trinidad and Tobago
Athletes (track and field) at the 2019 Pan American Games
Alabama Crimson Tide women's track and field athletes